Green Local Schools is a school district serving Green, Ohio. The superintendent is Jeffrey L. Miller II.

Schools
Green High School (grades 9 through 12)
Green Middle School (grades 7 and 8)
Green Intermediate School (grades 4, 5, and 6)
Green Primary School (grades 1, 2, and 3)
Greenwood Early Learning Center (preschool and kindergarten)

Kleckner Elementary School, which housed grades 3 and 4, was closed at the end of the 2011 school year due to financial constraints. The original part of the building was constructed in 1903.

Demographics
On average, 4026 students attend Green Local Schools. The majority of the students are white (92.3%), while other races include 2.2% Asian or Pacific Islander, 2.2% Multiracial, 1.9% Black, and 1.2% Hispanic. Approximately 12.7% of the students have disabilities and 1.5% have limited English proficiency. Around 18.2% of students are economically disadvantaged.

Career Center
The Portage Lakes Career Center, or PLCC, is a local building in the Green Local Schools district that allows high school students to take courses that can help them learn skills that would be used in real-world jobs.

Portage Lakes Career Center is in compliance with the standard and criteria for Postsecondary Schools established by the Board of Trustees of the North Central Association Commission on Accreditation and School Improvement (NCA CASI).

Lunch scandal
In late 2019, staff at Green Primary School disposed of a student's hot lunch and replaced it with a cheese sandwich with milk, due to his negative lunch money balance, on top of that it was his birthday:September 3. According to his grandma upon coming off the bus he said that it was his "worst birthday ever". Green Local Schools addressed the allegations later that week and reformed its lunch policy after receiving nation-wide criticism.

References

External links
 District Website
 PLCC Website

School districts in Summit County, Ohio